Massachusetts Avenue Historic District may refer to:

 Massachusetts Avenue Commercial District, listed on the NRHP in Indianapolis, Indiana
 Massachusetts Avenue Historic District (Worcester, Massachusetts), listed on the NRHP in Worcester, Massachusetts
 Massachusetts Avenue Historic District (Washington, D.C.), listed on the NRHP in Washington, D.C.